The action of 4 May 1917 was a naval and air engagement of the First World War in the North Sea. The action took place between the German Zeppelin LZ 92 (tactical name: L.43), several German submarines and a naval force led by the Australian light cruiser . The action was inconclusive with no casualties on either side, concluding when the Zeppelin had dropped all of its bombs and the cruisers had expended all of their anti-aircraft ammunition.

Action
Sydney was serving in British waters when on 4 May 1917, while part of an anti-submarine patrol from Rosyth, Scotland, the ship took part in a battle with a German Zeppelin, L.43, commanded by Kapitänleutnant Hermann Kraushaar. In concert with another cruiser, Dublin and four destroyers, Obdurate, Nepean, Pelican and Pylades. Sydney, under the command of Commander John Dumaresq who was the second-in-command of the 2nd Light Cruiser Squadron, had been patrolling between the Firth of Forth and River Humber, when lookouts spotted a vessel on the surface to the east of the British flotilla and Obdurate was detailed to investigate at around 10:00 am.

Obdurate continued to investigate the surface contact and subsequently located two German submarines. Coming under attack from one of these submarines, the destroyer dropped depth charges before turning away to attack the Zeppelin. As the destroyer closed on it, though, the Zeppelin turned away to the south-east. Within the space of the next half an hour, Dublin was unsuccessfully attacked by the German submarines at least three times with torpedoes, leading Dumaresq to conclude that the Germans were attempting to spring a trap on the British vessels. He subsequently ordered Obdurate to complete its investigation of the suspect vessel, which was subsequently determined to be a Dutch fishing vessel.

Dumaresq then attempted to draw the aircraft into following the British force by ordering his ships to turn away back onto their original course. As the airship approached again, Dublin and Sydney turned about to attack. In response, the Zeppelin's commander began a high-level bombing run on Dublin, but fast manoeuvres from the cruisers frustrated these efforts and the Zeppelin's attention turned instead to Obdurate, dropping three bombs which achieved near misses. This was followed by a further attack on Sydney, with between ten and twelve bombs being dropped but missing due to the cruiser's wild evasive manoeuvres. Sydney returned fire with her anti-aircraft guns but the aircraft proved to be flying too high to be successfully engaged.

A further Zeppelin moved towards the battle at around 1:00 pm, having been contacted by L.43 for assistance but it loitered to the north-east and did not close in to attack. The engagement ended when both sides exhausted their ammunition around 2:30 pm. The Zeppelin was forced to remain high to stay out of range of the flak, this meant that the bombs were dropped from too great of height to strike the Allied patrol. There was no damage or casualties. After the action, the Zeppelins departed the area and the British vessels completed their patrol before returning to Rosyth.

The action was commemorated in the early 1930s, in an oil painting by Australian war artist Charles Bryant. It was the first time that a Royal Australian Navy vessel had been attacked by an enemy aircraft and was one of the actions that resulted in Sydney being awarded the "North Sea 1916–18" battle honour.

References
Citations

Bibliography

 
 
 

Conflicts in 1917
1917 in the United Kingdom
Naval battles of World War I involving Australia
Naval battles of World War I involving Germany
North Sea operations of World War I
Aerial operations and battles of World War I
Battles and conflicts without fatalities
May 1917 events